Estadio Fernando Mazuera is a multi-use stadium in Fusagasugá, Colombia.  It is currently used mostly for football matches and is the home stadium of Expreso Rojo.  The stadium holds 4,500 people.

References

Fernando Mazuera
Buildings and structures in Cundinamarca Department